Juggalo Championship Wrestling (formerly Juggalo Championshit Wrestling) is an American independent professional wrestling promotion founded in 1999 by Violent J (Joseph Bruce) and Shaggy 2 Dope (Joseph Utsler), better known as the hip-hop duo Insane Clown Posse. JCW currently runs shows throughout the country. The video games Backyard Wrestling: Don't Try This at Home and Backyard Wrestling 2: There Goes the Neighborhood feature numerous independent wrestlers from the promotion.

The style of JCW is largely based upon hardcore wrestling. Bruce and Utsler refer to Extreme Championship Wrestling as the major influence on the company's style as well as their unique camera angles, which they compare to that of the movie Natural Born Killers; "fading in and out, and turning all over." In early years of the company, talent mostly consisted of rappers and well-known names performing under parody alternate-names. The company instituted a change in the roster after changing their name, focusing more on independent and hardcore wrestlers, as well as several established names.

JCW records the majority of its shows and releases them in episodes of SlamTV! and on DVDs, which are sold on its online store. It launched the JCW Wrestling School with Kevin Canady as head trainer in 2010. That December, the promotion began running bi-weekly events at The Modern Exchange in Southgate, Michigan and established a video distributing partnership with HighSpots.com. In March 2011, it launched a broadcasting website and began showing its bi-weekly events live on internet pay-per-view (iPPV).

History

Strangle-Mania Live (1997) 
On March 12, 1996, Insane Clown Posse released a VHS entitled ICP's Strangle-Mania, which featured a compilation of death matches from the Outrageously Violent Wrestling From Japan video collection, overdubbed with their own humorous commentary. Following the release, the duo, along with local Detroit booker Dan Curtis, hosted the event ICP's Strangle-Mania Live on December 17, 1997 at the sold out St. Andrew's Hall. One year later, Curtis and the group coordinated another Strangle-Mania Live type show called Hellfire Wrestling, which would be followed by an eighty-city Hellfire Wrestling tour. Curtis booked the talent and wrote the scripts. "Hellfire Wrestling" sold out the Majestic Theater in Detroit. Two days after the show, Curtis was found dead in his apartment, due to a sudden diabetic problem. The Hellfire Wrestling tour was subsequently canceled.

Juggalo Championshit Wrestling (1999–2006) 

Booked by Brian Gorie and Dave Prazak, Insane Clown Posse held the first "Juggalo Championshxt Wrestling" event on December 19, 1999 at St. Andrews Hall in Detroit, Michigan. The event featured seven matches and included such wrestlers as The Iron Sheik, King Kong Bundy, and Abdullah the Butcher. Insane Clown Posse defeated the team of two Doink the Clowns to become the first JCW Tag Team Champions, and Evil Dead won a Hardcore Battle royal to be crowned the first JCW Heavyweight Champion. The event was filmed and released as JCW Vol. 1 on May 9, 2000. Lasting 38 weeks on the Billboard Sports and Recreation Top Sellers list, the video charted as high as number 2. Prazak, however, left the company over financial issues, leaving Gorie to solely book the company.

In April and May 2000, Gorie booked a 15-city Strangle-Mania Live Tour, spanning from Detroit to Denver. The tour focused less on older wrestlers and featured more younger talent such as Chris Hero and Mad Man Pondo. JCW Vol. 2 was filmed during tour stops in both Cleveland and Milwaukee, and was released on July 23, 2001. The video charted as high as number 8 on the Billboard Sports and Recreation Top Sellers list. The promotion later held several matches at the first annual Gathering of the Juggalos, which it has continued to do ever since. Brian Gorie left the company shortly after, and Bruce and Utsler took full control of booking the events themselves.

On August 21, 2000, the company received mainstream exposure when wrestler Vampiro, who was also the JCW Heavyweight Champion, brought the title out with him on World Championship Wrestling's nationally televised WCW Monday Nitro. He proceeded to proclaim that the JCW Heavyweight Championship was the only world title that meant anything to him before giving Tank Abbott a match for the title. The match was called by Bruce and Utsler, called under their "3D" and "Gweedo" personas, who also interfered in the match to cost Abbott the championship.

In 2002, the promotion was the second highest grossing wrestling organization in the United States. The following year, Bruce and Utsler set plans to record matches for JCW Vol. 3 at the 2003 Gathering of the Juggalos. However, due to the amount of injuries sustained by the wrestlers and the rowdiness of the fans, the footage was scrapped. Another event was scheduled in Columbus, Ohio and filmed at the Newport Music Hall for the video. The event continued to bring in younger talent such as M-Dogg 20, Josh Prohibition, Nosawa, and Necro Butcher. JCW Vol. 3 was released on DVD on November 11 of that year. Two weeks later, JCW Vol. 1 and JCW Vol. 2 were both individually re-released onto the DVD format.

Name change and development (2007–2010) 

Following the release of the first three JCW videos, the company sporadically began referring to itself as Juggalo Championship Wrestling. On July 16, 2007, the company updated its website, changing all references of itself to Juggalo Championship Wrestling. Their logo, however, continued to display the words "Juggalo Championshit Wrestling" until late 2008. In late 2006, the company began a three-month cross-promotional rivalry with Philadelphia-based promotion Pro Wrestling Unplugged. The relationship between the companies continued after the events, as PWU owner Tod Gordon allowed multiple wrestlers to compete for JCW in their upcoming tour.

In March 2007, the company began filming the internet wrestling program SlamTV! on Insane Clown Posse’s twenty-two city tour entitled The Tempest Release Party. The episodes lead up to the first annual Bloodymania wrestling event, which was held at that year's Gathering of the Juggalos. The programming featured an array of independent wrestlers, including Human Tornado, Zach Gowen, The Thomaselli Brothers, and Trent Acid, as well as several well-known wrestlers, such as The Great Muta, Justin Credible, 2 Cold Scorpio, and Scott Hall. Both the first season and Bloodymania were released on DVD later that year, and became the first wrestling videos ever sold throughout the entire Hot Topic store chain.

The post-season saw the formation of the group Juggalo World Order. Season two of SlamTV! was filmed on the Slam TV Tour 2008. While shorter than the first season, the programming introduced notable manager Scott D'Amore and wrestler Raven, as well as the JCW Tag Team Tournament with eight teams. On May 17, 2008, Juggalo Championship Wrestling hosted matches at the inaugural Hatchet Attacks. At the following year's event, the company held its first women's wrestling match in a decade. Both Bloodymania III and Bloodymania IV were held in the following two years with no build up from full SlamTV! seasons.

Running full-time (2010–present) 
In January 2010, the company announced plans to run full-time and launched the JCW Wrestling School with Kevin Canady as head trainer. That August, Juggalo Championship Wrestling began a video distributing partnership with HighSpots.com. On December 22, it began running biweekly events at The Modern Exchange in Southgate, Michigan. All shows are planned to be taped and released on DVD. Scott Hall was made Executive Consultant to Juggalo Championship Wrestling in February 2011. Later that month, Vampiro came out of retirement and returned as both a wrestler and a company consultant. He raised hopes of developing talent, taking the company international, and, more specifically, bringing it to Latin America.

The company held its first internet pay-per-view, called Hatchet Attacks, on March 26, 2011. The event was filmed and shown live online by the venue The Rave. Juggalo Championship Wrestling later launched its own broadcasting website for its bi-weekly events, and transmitted its first self-produced internet pay-per-view on April 6. JCW would go on to hold more self-produced internet pay-per-views on April 20, May 4, May 18, June 30, July 20 and 28, 2011. The "F*ck The Police" internet pay-per-view would prove to be their final internet pay-per-view until holding another in May 2012 at the Hatchet Attacks supershow. The 2012 Gathering of the Juggalos was heavily hyped for a first ever face-off between Corporal Robinson and The Rude Boy, both JCW legends. The match did not take place as planned due to Corporal Robinson being released from JCW, with Psychopathic Records officially announcing that Robinson had departed from the company. At the 2013 Gathering of the Juggalos it was announced that Evil Dead and Mad Man Pondo were inducted into the new JCW Hall of Fame, being the first two inductees.

SlamTV! 

SlamTV! is an internet wrestling show, broadcast by the Insane Clown Posse's wrestling promotion Juggalo Championship Wrestling. It features color commentary by "Handsome Harley 'Gweedo' Guestella" (Shaggy 2 Dope) and "Diamond Donovan '3D' Douglas" (Violent J), with "Luscious" Johnny Stark (Twiztid's Jamie Madrox) filling in whenever needed. Its initial run was 20 episodes, taped on a nationwide tour entitled "The Tempest Release Party". Until its creation, aside from three initial DVDs, the only way to view JCW was in person or home videos.

Style and production 
Juggalo Championship Wrestling was founded largely upon hardcore wrestling, but has since blended it with the Puroresu and high flying Lucha libre wrestling styles. Their roster features a mix of independent and veteran performers. Corporal Robinson, wrestler and creative writer for the company, calls the product "totally different than your average wrestling show. It's got crazy and outlandish characters, it's got hard hitting hardcore matches, it's got music, it's got your high flyers. It's got a little taste of every flavor."

Along with their unique blend of wrestling styles, several other aspects of the company have drawn comparisons to Extreme Championship Wrestling. Alex Marvez of Scripps Howard News Service has drawn parallels between the two companies' energetic fans. 1wrestling Radio host Bruce Wirt calls Juggalo Championship Wrestling a "modern day [and] better version of ECW" because of their fan base, wrestling styles, and original stories. Co-founders Joseph Bruce and Joseph Utsler themselves refer to Extreme Championship Wrestling as the major influence on the company's style as well as their unique camera angles, which they compare to that of the movie Natural Born Killers; "fading in and out, and turning all over."

Bruce Wirt praises the company as an alternative to WWE and Total Nonstop Action Wrestling due to its unique characteristics. Juggalo Championship Wrestling features a live musical performance at each wrestling event, leading Wirt to compare the combination to that of WWE's Rock 'n' Wrestling Connection. Shaggy 2 Dope and Kevin Gill provide commentary, which has been described as sometimes politically incorrect and "sidesplittingly funny." The company also notably does not have rematch clauses, instead forcing former champions to wrestle their way back up to the main event.

Broadcasts 

Juggalo Championship Wrestling began its first broadcast with the internet wrestling program SlamTV! Running from April 7, 2007 to August 4, 2008, the program aired 21 episodes in two seasons. The video release of the first season was the first wrestling DVD ever sold at the entire Hot Topic store chain. A brief series called Slam TV Express later ran for three episodes from May 25 to June 4, 2010.

On March 26, 2011, the company produced its first live internet pay-per-view (iPPV), called Hatchet Attacks. Juggalo Championship Wrestling began broadcasting bi-weekly iPPV events on April 6. The company runs most its events at The Modern Exchange in Southgate, Michigan, in what are considered television tapings. Major events occur every several weeks at concert venues throughout the United States. Annual shows include Hatchet Attacks, Oddball Wrestling, Flashlight Wrestling, Hallowicked After Party, Big Ballas' X-Mas Party, and the company's premier wrestling event Bloodymania.

Current champions

Filmography 

 JCW, Volume 1 (2000)
 JCW, Volume 2 (2001)
 JCW, Volume 3 (2003)
 JCW: SlamTV – Episodes 1 thru 9 (2007)
 JCW: SlamTV – Episodes 10 thru 15 featuring Bloodymania (2007)
 JCW: Wrestling at the Gathering 2010 (2011)
 JCW: Wrestling at Hatchet Attacks 2011 (2011)
 JCW: Lights, Camera, Bash 'EmiPPV April 6, 2011 (2011) JCW: Up In Smoke iPPV April 20, 2011 (2011)
 JCW: St. Andrews Brawl iPPV May 4, 2011 (2011)
 JCW: Pony Down Throwdown iPPV May 18, 2011 (2011)
 JCW: Send In The Clowns iPPV June 30, 2011 (2011)
 JCW: Above The Law iPPV July 20, 2011 (2011)
 JCW: F*ck The Police iPPV July 28, 2011 (2011)
 JCW: Wrestling at Hatchet Attacks 2012 (2012)
 JCW: Bloodymania 6 featuring The Road to Bloodymania 6 (2012)
 JCW: Oddball Brawl'' iPPV (2013)

See also
List of Juggalo Championship Wrestling employees

References

External links 
 
 Broadcasting website
 JCW Main Event radio show

 
Independent professional wrestling promotions based in the Midwestern United States
Psychopathic Records